The amaZulu are the Zulu people of southern Africa.

Amazulu or AmaZulu may also refer to:

 AmaZulu F.C., a South African football club
 Amazulu FC (Zimbabwe), a defunct Zimbabwean football club
 Amazulu (band), a British ska band of the 1980s
 AmaZulu: The Children of Heaven, a 2006 British documentary film directed by Hannan Majid and Richard York
 Amazulu (album), debut studio album of South African singer-songwriter Amanda Black
 "Amazulu" (song), a 2016 song by Amanda Black

See also
 Zulu (disambiguation)
 Zululand (disambiguation)